The Argenta Branch Library is a branch of the North Little Rock Public Library System in North Little Rock, Arkansas, United States. The building is a brick Georgian Revival constructed in 1931 to a design by Arkansas architect Charles L. Thompson.  It was used as a post office until 2011, and was opened as a branch library in 2014.

The building was added to the National Register of Historic Places in 1982.

References

Post office buildings on the National Register of Historic Places in Arkansas
Neoclassical architecture in Arkansas
Library buildings completed in 1931
Buildings and structures in North Little Rock, Arkansas
Libraries in Arkansas
Post office buildings in Arkansas
National Register of Historic Places in Pulaski County, Arkansas